The  is a limited express train service in Japan operated by Shikoku Railway Company (JR Shikoku), which runs from  to . Trains are formed of 3-car or 2+3 car sets of 2700 series DMUs, and sometimes are coupled with Shimanto services between Tatotsu or Utazu and Kochi.

Route
The main stations served by this service are as follows.
 -  - Awa-Ikeda -

Rolling stock
 2700 series 3- or 5-car tilting DMUs (2019– )

Past rolling stock
 KiHa 181 series DMUs (1972–1990)
 KiHa 185 series DMUs (1986–1991)
 2000/N2000 series tilting DMUs (1990–2021)

History
New 2700 series trains started operation in 2019, and completely replaced all older 2000 series DMUs by March 2021.

References

Named passenger trains of Japan
Shikoku Railway Company
Railway services introduced in 1950